Warslow is a small village in Staffordshire, England.
Although in the county of Staffordshire, the village lies close to the Derbyshire border, and has a Stockport postal code (SK), but the address is Warslow, Buxton, Derbyshire.

History
Warslow is recorded as part of Alstonefield manor in the 1086 Domesday Book. In 1327, fourteen tax payers (property owners) were assessed. The population grew in the late 18th century with the development of mining at Ecton, to a high point of 854 in 1821.

Education
The village once had two schools, but due to the lack of children from the village itself and the surrounding villages only one of the schools is still used. The other is now the Boys' Brigade. Manifold Primary School (still in use as the secondary school until the early 1980s) caters mainly for children between the ages of 4 to 9, however they do also have a nursery department which caters to pre-school children. On occasion the school will allow for a group of children to stay at the school for an extra two years, as opposed to going straight to a secondary school. The two main schools which the pupils will attend after leaving are: Churnet View Middle School and Saint Edward's Middle School, both located in Leek).

Religion
The village has two chapels and one church. The church of St Lawrence has an unusually wide chancel and windows by William Morris. Of the two chapels, one has been converted into a house and the other is in the process of being converted.

Springs
There are numerous fresh water springs located within the village and at one time this water was bottled and sold. The water can still be drunk or obtained freely from these sources.

Buildings
The Grade II listed Warslow Hall, just off the B5053 north of Warslow village, was built by Sir George Crewe in 1830. 

The village has a single public house, The Greyhound (formerly known as The Greyhound and Hare), which dates back to around 1750. It is located roughly in the centre of the village, across the road from the fully converted chapel. There is a village hall. Both the village post office and shop are now closed.

See also
Listed buildings in Warslow and Elkstones
Hulme End
Elkstones

References

External links

Towns and villages of the Peak District
Villages in Staffordshire
Staffordshire Moorlands